Porters Pass (elevation 939 metres) is a mountain pass in the Canterbury region of New Zealand's South Island.

It is near Lake Lyndon and is located within Korowai/Torlesse Tussocklands Park. State Highway 73 travels through the pass on its route from Springfield to Cass, and it is the last mountain pass on the route eastwards from Westland to Christchurch. It is also the third-highest point on the South Island's state highway network, after the Lindis Pass and the Milford Road (though it is just one metre lower). Although Arthur's Pass is better known, Porters Pass is a few metres higher, and it affords views of the Canterbury Plains. The Porter brothers, who were farming nearby, named the pass in 1858.

References

External links

Korowai/Torlesse Tussocklands Park page at the Department of Conservation

Landforms of Canterbury, New Zealand
Mountain passes of the Southern Alps
Transport in Canterbury, New Zealand